John Tracy Estes is an American politician from the state of Alabama. He currently represents Alabama's 17th District in the Alabama House of Representatives as a member of the Republican Party.

Education 
Estes graduated from the University of Alabama with a bachelor's degree in news editorial journalism in 1989.

Career 
After graduating from the University of Alabama in 1989, Estes began working as an employee as the Tuscaloosa News. After a year of working at the Tuscaloosa News, he took a new job with the Montgomery Advertiser Sports Department. In 1991, he quit to take a news editor position at the Journal Record Newspaper, Marion County. He worked as an editor for 27 years before retiring to run for office. During his time as an editor, Estes became a member of the Marion County Republican Party. Estes was also a member of the Alabama Association of School Boards Board of Directors and Winfield Chamber of Commerce. During his time as a legislator, Estes won the Legislative Award from the Alabama Association of School Boards Board of Directors. Estes narrowly defeated his 2018 Republican primary opponent, Phil Segraves, by 139 votes after being endorsed by the Conservation Alabama Action Fund. Estes then won the 2018 General Election with 98.8% of the vote.

Committee Positions 
Estes is a member of the Education Policy, Public Safety and Homeland Security, and Children and Senior Advocacy Committees

Elections

Alabama House of Representatives District 17

2018 Republican Primary

2018 Republican Runoff

2018 General Election

References 

Republican Party members of the Alabama House of Representatives
University of Alabama alumni
Tuscaloosa, Alabama
Marion County, Alabama
Living people
21st-century American politicians
1967 births